"Right Back" is a song by American singer Khalid from his 2019 album Free Spirit. It was originally recorded as a solo version and charted as an album track in April 2019 before being released as a single in a version featuring American rapper A Boogie wit da Hoodie on August 2, 2019.

Critical reception
Alex Zidel of HotNewHipHop said the song "already sounded complete but Khalid had a thought: What if we add A Boogie wit da Hoodie to this? That would make it a hit, right? It turns out that he was correct."

Track listing
Single version
"Right Back" (featuring A Boogie wit da Hoodie) – 4:15

Album version
"Right Back" – 3:35

Charts

Album version

Remix version

Weekly charts

Year-end charts

Certifications

Release history

References

2019 singles
2019 songs
Khalid (singer) songs
A Boogie wit da Hoodie songs
Songs written by Khalid (singer)
Songs written by Mikkel Storleer Eriksen
Songs written by Tor Erik Hermansen
Songs written by Rodney Jerkins
Song recordings produced by Stargate (record producers)
Songs written by Michele Williams